Raivo Nõmmik (born 11 February 1977) is a retired football defender from Estonia. He played for several clubs in his native country, including JK Tallinna Kalev and JK Viljandi Tulevik. He has also played for Finnish club MyPa Anjalankoski.

International career
Nõmmik earned his first official cap for the Estonia national football team on 20 May 1995, when Estonia played Lithuania at the Baltic Cup 1995. He obtained a total number of 17 caps for his native country.

References

1977 births
Living people
Estonian footballers
Estonia international footballers
Association football defenders
JK Tallinna Kalev players
Viljandi JK Tulevik players
Estonian expatriate footballers
Estonian expatriate sportspeople in Finland
Expatriate footballers in Finland
Footballers from Tallinn
Veikkausliiga players
Myllykosken Pallo −47 players